Ashtoret is a genus of crabs in the family Matutidae, containing the following species:
 Ashtoret granulosa (Miers, 1877)
 Ashtoret lunaris (Forskål, 1775)
 Ashtoret maculata (Miers, 1877)
 Ashtoret miersii (Henderson, 1887)
 Ashtoret obtusifrons (Miers, 1877)
 Ashtoret picta (Hess, 1865)
 Ashtoret sangiannulata Galil & Clark, 1994
 Ashtoret shengmuae Galil & Clark, 1994

In addition, a single, unnamed, fossil species is known from the Miocene of Japan.

References

Calappoidea
Extant Miocene first appearances